Rough Stuff is a 1925 silent film drama directed by Dell Henderson and starring George Larkin.

It is preserved in the Library of Congress collection.

Cast
George Larkin
Mary Beth Milford

References

External links

1925 films
1925 drama films
American silent feature films
American black-and-white films
Films directed by Dell Henderson
Silent American drama films
1920s American films